Joint Task Force North (JTF North), formerly Joint Task Force Six (JTF-6), is a multi-service operation by the United States Department of Defense for counterdrug and anti-terrorist operations.  JTF-North is headquartered at Biggs Army Airfield, Fort Bliss, Texas. United States Northern Command is the controlling Unified Combatant Command.

On 2 July 2019, acting Commander, COL Paul Garcia, relinquished command to Brigadier General Reginald G. A. Neal. On 06 November 2020, Major General Neal transferred command to Major General Randall V. Simmons, Jr., who is the former commander as of December 14, 2022. Major General Matthew D. Smith assumed command on December 14, 2022, and is the 11th Commander of JTF-N.

History 

The JTF was originally activated as Joint Task Force Six (JTF-6) in November 1989 with a purely counter-drug mission. In 2004 it was renamed JTF North and added counter-terrorism to its mission, due in part to the efforts of Major M. W. Robinson, who, in his spare time, wrote the threat assessments for the Gulf Coast ports and access points available to terror elements worldwide. However, he was unable to get senior military officials to adopt changes to the JTF-6 mission.  He reasoned the prime threat to port security is the continued storage of foreign containers at port facilities that U.S. Customs and Border Protection is unable to search and clear for numerous reasons, including manpower and Free Trade Zone restrictions. He reported to the U.S. Department of Defense that containers stored without controls were a continual threat from terrorist organizations who could store weapons of mass destruction for future use.

Well-known former members of Joint Task Force 6 include: General Kevin P. Byrnes, U.S. Army, Ret., JTF-6 Commanding General; Colonel Robert Love, USMC, Ret., and current Senior Executive Service (SES) member to the DoD's Task Force for Business and Stability Operations (TFBSO); Special Forces LTC Eric Buckland, U.S. Army, Ret., and Captain Kirk Harrington, owner of EFMC, LLC.

Mission casualties 
On 21 May 1995, during JTF-6 Mission "Smugglers Blues" (a joint air reconnaissance mission conducted along the US and Mexico border near Nogales, Arizona) Chief Warrant Officer 2 (CW2) Kevin L. Jenkins and Chief Warrant Officer 2 (CW2) John D. Peterson, both from Alpha Troop, 1st Squadron, 6th Cavalry Regiment (1/6 CAV) station in Fort Hood, Texas, died when their OH-58C helicopter crashed during a night surveillance mission.
  
On 2 June 1996, during JTF-6 Mission JT177-96, (a ground reconnaissance mission conducted in the Angeles National Forest, California) Lance Corporal Eric D. Davis of Company B, 1st Battalion, 5th Marine Regiment (1/5) died as the result of a fall.

Scandals 
On 20 May 1997, during an operation in Redford, Texas, near the United States–Mexico border, Corporal Clemente M. Banuelos, the leader of his squad, fatally shot 18-year-old American citizen Esequiel Hernández, Jr., on the American side of the border. He was holding a .22 caliber rifle he used to protect his herd of goats from predators. Marines alleged that he pointed the rifle at them, although they were some 200 yards away and heavily camouflaged in ghillie suits. No charges were brought at the time or subsequently.

The shooting inspired the 2005 film The Three Burials of Melquíades Estrada by Tommy Lee Jones. The 2007 documentary The Ballad of Esequiel Hernández explores the killing, analyzing both sides of the issue by interviewing the Hernández family and friends, the Marines, and local officials.

References

External links 
 
 Official factsheet
 Global Security: Joint Task Force Six
 Congressman Reyes: "JTF-6 Adds Their Expertise to War on Terror"

Joint task forces of the United States Armed Forces
Military units and formations established in 2004